Eillium Island is a small island  north-west of Rumbo Punta, the north-west tip of Laurie Island in the South Orkney Islands of Antarctica. It was first seen and roughly charted by Captain George Powell and Captain Nathaniel Palmer during their joint cruise in 1821. It was recharted in 1903 by the Scottish National Antarctic Expedition under Dr. William S. Bruce, who named it for his son Eillium.

Important Bird Area
The 57 ha island has been identified as an Important Bird Area (IBA) by BirdLife International because it supports a large breeding colony of about 21,000 pairs of chinstrap penguins.

See also 
 List of Antarctic and subantarctic islands

References 

Islands of the South Orkney Islands
Important Bird Areas of Antarctica
Penguin colonies